Illinois Jacquet and His Orchestra (also released as Groovin' with Jacquet) is an album by American jazz saxophonist Illinois Jacquet recorded in 1955 and originally released on the Clef label.

Reception

Allmusic awarded the album 3 stars.

Track listing
All compositions by Illinois Jacquet and Harry Edison, except as indicated.
 "Honeysuckle Rose" (Fats Waller, Andy Razaf) - 6:48
 "Cool Bill" - 5:50
 "Learnin' the Blues" (Dolores "Vicki" Silvers) - 2:41
 "Stardust" (Hoagy Carmichael, Mitchell Parish) - 3:45
 "Love Is Here to Stay" (George Gershwin, Ira Gershwin) - 4:31 	
 "Empathy" - 4:46
 "East of the Sun (and West of the Moon)" (Brooks Bowman) - 4:45
 "Sophia" - 4:14

Personnel 
Illinois Jacquet - tenor saxophone
Harry Edison - trumpet
Carl Perkins - piano (tracks 1 & 3-8)
Gerald Wiggins - organ (tracks 1-3 & 5-8)
Irving Ashby - guitar
Curtis Counce - bass
Al Bartee - drums

References 

1956 albums
Illinois Jacquet albums
Clef Records albums
Verve Records albums
Albums produced by Norman Granz